Mirbelia ferricola is a species of flowering plant in the family Fabaceae and is endemic to inland parts of the south-west of Western Australia. It is an erect shrub with leaves reduced to small scales, and red and yellow flowers arranged in racemes at the ends of the branches.

Description

Taxonomy
Mirbelia ferricola was first formally described in 2012 by Ryonen Butcher in the journal Nuytsia from specimens collected in the Helena and Aurora Range in 2008. The specific epithet (ferricola) means "iron-inhabiting", referring to the soil in which this species grows.

Distribution and habitat
This mirbelia grows on rocky lateritic soils in woodland and shrubland in banded iron formations in the Avon Wheatbelt, Coolgardie and Murchison bioregions of south-western, Western Australia.

Conservation status
This mirbelia is listed as "Priority Three" by the Government of Western Australia Department of Biodiversity, Conservation and Attractions, meaning that it is poorly known and known from only a few locations but is not under imminent threat.

References

Mirbelioids
ferricola
Fabales of Australia
Flora of Western Australia
Plants described in 2012